Jiří Procházka (born October 14, 1992) is a Czech mixed martial artist. He currently competes in the Light Heavyweight division in the Ultimate Fighting Championship (UFC), where he is the former UFC Light Heavyweight Champion. He was the inaugural Rizin Fighting Federation Light Heavyweight Champion and the inaugural Gladiator Fighting Championship Light Heavyweight Champion. As of February 14, 2023, he is #11 in the UFC men's pound-for-pound rankings, and as of December 6, 2022, he is #1 in the UFC light heavyweight rankings.

Early life
Procházka was born on October 14, 1992 in the south Moravian part of Czechoslovakia (now Czech Republic). Procházka's father died when he was 6 years old. In his youth, Procházka played amateur football for TJ Družstevník Hostěradice. He was also an active freestyle BMX rider and a floorball player.

As a teen, Procházka partook in street fights almost weekly, getting into more than 100 of them. This eventually led him to join the hooligan club tied to Prochazka's local soccer team, FC Zbrojovka Brno, where he would take part in organized group street fights with clubs of other teams, even participating in 30-on-30 brawls.

Procházka first encountered mixed martial arts before beginning high school, after a friend showed him videos of kickboxer Ramon Dekkers and mixed martial artists Mirko Filipovic and Fedor Emelianenko. After watching the film Never Back Down, he began to train in martial arts, in particular Thai boxing.

Mixed martial arts career

Gladiator Fighting Championship

Debut and initial fights
Procházka made his professional MMA debut in April 2012 for the Gladiator Fighting Championship, the biggest promotion in his native Czech Republic at the time. He amassed a 7–2 record within his first two years of fighting professionally.

Inaugural Light Heavyweight Champion
In his tenth professional bout, he won the inaugural GCF Light Heavyweight Championship in the back-and-forth fight against Czech MMA pioneer Martin Šolc via flying knee knockout on December 7, 2013 at GCF 26 FN. Video of the bout went viral in the Czech Republic and Procházka was also awarded a post-fight bonus. The fight was later awarded 'Czech Fight of the Year' by major media outlets.

Procházka defended his title against Tomáš Penz on June 6, 2014 at GCF 28: Cage Fight 4. He won the fight via technical knockout due to a flying knee in 41 seconds.

Procházka signed a deal with the Rizin Fighting Federation shortly before his win against Evgeni Kondratov. After amassing a record of 14–2–1 during his first three years in the sport, Procházka as the first Czech entered the Rizin Fighting Federation in 2015.

Rizin Fighting Federation

Heavyweight Grand Prix
Procházka made his promotional debut against Satoshi Ishii on December 29, 2015 in the World Grand Prix 2015 –100 kg tournament at the Rizin FF's first event Saraba no Utake. He won the quarter-final fight via knockout in the first round.

Procházka's next fight in the Rizin FF's -100 kg tournament was at Iza no Mai on December 31, 2015. He won the semi-final fight against Vadim Nemkov via technical knockout. Later that same night, he lost in the final round against Muhammed Lawal via knockout in the first round. Procházka weighed in at 95.9 kgs (211.5 pounds) for the tournament.

Procházka faced Kazuyuki Fujita on April 17, 2016 at Rizin 1 at a catchweight of 110 kgs (242.5 pounds). Procházka weighed in at 98.6 kgs (217.3 pounds) for the bout. He won the fight via technical knockout in the first round.

Procházka faced Mark Tanios on September 25, 2016 at Rizin 2 - Rizin Fighting World Grand Prix 2016: Opening Round. He won the fight via unanimous decision. Procházka suffered a knee injury during the fight and was subsequently pulled from the tournament.

Return to Light Heavyweight
Procházka faced Willian Roberto Alves on September 29, 2017, at Fusion FN 16 - Cage Fight, the homecoming event organized by his team. He won the fight via technical knockout in the first round.

Procházka faced Karl Albrektsson on December 29, 2017 at Rizin Fighting World Grand Prix 2017 - Bantamweight Tournament: 2nd Round. He won the fight via technical knockout in the first round.

Procházka faced Bruno Cappelozza on July 28, 2018, at Rizin 11. He won the fight via knockout in the first round.

Procházka faced Jake Heun on September 30, 2018 at Rizin 13. He won the fight via technical knockout in the first round.

Procházka was scheduled to face Emanuel Newton on December 31, 2018 at Rizin 14. However, Newton was pulled out of the fight, citing a rib injury. Procházka remained on the card and was rescheduled to face Brandon Halsey. He won the fight via technical knockout in the first round.

Inaugural Light Heavyweight Champion
Procházka faced Muhammed Lawal in rematch on April 21, 2019 at Rizin 15 for the inaugural Rizin FF Light Heavyweight Championship. He won the fight via technical knockout in the third round.

Procházka faced Fábio Maldonado on October 12, 2019 at Rizin 19: Lightweight Grand Prix 1st Round at a catchweight of 100 kgs (220.4 pounds). Procházka weighed in at 97.90 kgs (215.8 pounds) for the bout. He won the fight via knockout in the first round.

Procházka defended his title against C. B. Dollaway on December 31, 2019, at Rizin 20. He won the fight via knockout in the first round. This was the last fight on the Procházka's contract with Rizin. After the fight, he signed a new deal with the UFC and vacated his title.

Ultimate Fighting Championship

Debut and contender fight
Procházka signed a contract with the UFC in January 2020. He made his promotional debut against former UFC Light Heavyweight title challenger Volkan Oezdemir on July 11, 2020 at UFC 251. He won via knockout in the second round and was awarded a Performance of the Night bonus award.

Procházka was expected to face two–time UFC Light Heavyweight Championship title challenger Dominick Reyes on February 27, 2021 at UFC Fight Night 186. However, in late January, Reyes was pulled from the fight, due to injury, and the bout was rescheduled for May 1, 2021 at UFC on ESPN: Reyes vs. Procházka. In a back and forth fight, Procházka won the fight via knockout in the second round. With this win, he was awarded the  Performance of the Night and Fight of the Night bonus awards.

UFC Light Heavyweight Champion
Procházka was scheduled to face Glover Teixeira for the UFC Light Heavyweight Championship on May 7, 2022 at UFC 274. However, the bout was postponed to June 11, 2022 at UFC 275 for undisclosed reasons. In a back-and-forth fight which saw both fighters get dropped multiple times, Procházka won the bout and title via rear-naked choke submission in the fifth round, becoming the first Czech fighter to win a UFC championship. This fight earned him the Fight of the Night award and the Crypto.com "Fan Bonus of the Night" award paid in bitcoin of US$20,000 for second place.

Procházka was booked to rematch Teixeira at UFC 282 on December 10, 2022. However, it was announced on November 23, 2022 that Procházka was forced out of the fight due to an injury to his right shoulder, and that he had vacated the title.

Personal life
Procházka is well-known as a devoted follower of the Bushido principles, the samurai moral values and the Miyamoto Musashi's teachings and philosophy, especially the Musashi's The Book of Five Rings, which Procházka considered as a life-changing book for him.

He is a supporter of FC Zbrojovka Brno and was involved in organized football hooliganism, including pre-arranged fights, until he started his professional combat sports career.

Besides his native Czech, Procházka is conversational in English and has actively improved his proficiency in the language since joining the promotion. While competing in UFC and Rizin FF, Procházka attended Masaryk University for his bachelor’s degree, majoring in  security forces physical fitness policy. He is also a graduate of the his local Protective Service Secondary Academy (Czech: SOŠ OOM), now the Brno's School of Law & Security (Czech: BPA).

Procházka  is known for his catchphrase, "BJP" (B'e-y'e-p'e). It is the Czech initialism for "Bomby jak piča(!)" (English: Bomb The Shit Out of 'Em[!] or Bomb-'em-up[!]), it is Procházka's battle cry and also the name of his merchandise brand.

His nickname, Denisa, is a girl's name in the Czech language  equivalent to the English Denise, and Deniska. It originated during a training camp, where Procházka had responded to his trainer's call for another fighter, who was a girl called Denisa.

Since 2017, Procházka has lived in a cottage about 30 minutes outside of his hometown of Brno, near a reservoir. The cottage has electricity and other amenities, however it has no gas and he gets his water out of a well.

Championships and achievements

Mixed martial arts
Ultimate Fighting Championship
UFC Light Heavyweight Championship (One time; former)
Fight of the Night (Two times) 
Performance of the Night (Two times) 
2021 Half-Year Awards: Best Fight of the 1HY 
2022 Fight of the Year 
 First champion from Czech Republic
 Rizin Fighting Federation
 RIZIN Light Heavyweight Championship (Inaugural; former)
 One successful title defense
2015 RIZIN Heavyweight Grand Prix Runner Up
 Gladiator Fighting Championship
 GFC Light Heavyweight Championship (Inaugural)
 One successful title defense
ESPN
2021 Midyear MMA Awards: Best Finish of the 1HY 
2022 Fight of the Year 
 Fight Club News Awards
 2013 Czech Fight of the Year vs. Martin Šolc on December 7
MMAjunkie.com
2021 May Knockout of the Month 
2022 June Fight of the Month 
2022 Fight of the Year 
World MMA Awards
2022 Fight of the Year 
Sherdog
2022 Fight of the Year 
Cageside Press
2022 Fight of the Year 
MMA Mania
2022 Fight of the Year 
MMA Fighting
2022 Fight of the Year 
Combat Press
2022 Fight of the Year 
Wrestling Observer Newsletter
2022 MMA Match of the Year

Muay Thai 
Czech Muay Thai Association
2011 Czech National Championships champion (−86.18 kg)

Mixed martial arts record

|-
|Win
|align=center|29–3–1
|Glover Teixeira
|Submission (rear-naked choke)
|UFC 275
|
|align=center|5
|align=center|4:32
|Kallang, Singapore
|
|-
|Win
|align=center|28–3–1
|Dominick Reyes
|KO (spinning back elbow)
|UFC on ESPN: Reyes vs. Procházka
|
|align=center|2
|align=center|4:29
|Las Vegas, Nevada, United States
|
|-
|Win
|align=center|27–3–1
|Volkan Oezdemir
|KO (punch)
|UFC 251
|
|align=center|2
|align=center|0:49
|Abu Dhabi, United Arab Emirates
|
|-
| Win
| align=center|26–3–1
| C. B. Dollaway
| KO (punches)
| Rizin 20
| 
| align=center|1
| align=center|1:55
| Saitama, Japan
| 
|-
| Win
| align=center|25–3–1
| Fábio Maldonado
| KO (punches)
| Rizin 19: Lightweight Grand Prix 1st Round
| 
| align=center|1
| align=center|1:49
| Osaka, Japan
|
|-
|Win
| align=center|24–3–1
| Muhammed Lawal
| TKO (punches)
| Rizin 15
| 
| align=center|3
| align=center|3:02
| Yokohama, Japan
| 
|-
| Win
| align=center|23–3–1
| Brandon Halsey
| TKO (submission to punches)
| Rizin 14
| 
| align=center|1
| align=center|6:30
| Saitama, Japan
|
|-
| Win
| align=center|22–3–1
| Jake Heun
| TKO (punches)
| Rizin 13
| 
| align=center|1
| align=center|4:29
| Saitama, Japan
|
|-
| Win
| align=center|21–3–1
| Bruno Cappelozza
| KO (punches)
| Rizin 11
| 
| align=center|1
| align=center|1:23
| Saitama, Japan
|
|-
| Win
| align=center|20–3–1
| Karl Albrektsson
| TKO (punches)
| Rizin World Grand Prix 2017: 2nd Round
| 
| align=center|1
| align=center|9:57
| Saitama, Japan
|
|-
| Win
| align=center|19–3–1
| Wilian Roberto Alves
| TKO (punches)
| Fusion FN 16: Cage Fight
| 
| align=center|1
| align=center|3:41
| Brno, Czech Republic
|
|-
| Win
| align=center|18–3–1
| Mark Tanios
| Decision (unanimous)
| Rizin World Grand Prix 2016: 1st Round
| 
| align=center|2
| align=center|5:00
| Saitama, Japan
|
|-
| Win
| align=center|17–3–1
| Kazuyuki Fujita
| KO (punch)
| Rizin 1
| 
| align=center|1
| align=center|3:18
| Nagoya, Japan
|
|-
| Loss
| align=center|16–3–1
| Muhammed Lawal
| KO (punch)
| rowspan=2|Rizin World Grand Prix 2015: Part 2 - Iza
| rowspan=2|
| align=center|1
| align=center|5:09
| rowspan=2| Saitama, Japan
|
|-
| Win
| align=center|16–2–1
| Vadim Nemkov
| TKO (retirement)
| align=center|1
| align=center|10:00
|
|-
| Win
| align=center|15–2–1
| Satoshi Ishii
| KO (head kick and knees)
| Rizin World Grand Prix 2015: Part 1 - Saraba
| 
| align=center|1
| align=center|1:36
| Saitama, Japan
|
|-
| Win
| align=center|14–2–1
| Evgeni Kondratov
| KO (punch)
| ProFC 59: Battle of Kursk 3
| 
| align=center|1
| align=center|4:23
| Kursk, Russia 
|
|-
| Win
| align=center|13–2–1
| Michał Fijałka
| TKO (corner stoppage)
| GCF 31: Cage Fight 6
| 
| align=center|1
| align=center|5:00
| Brno, Czech Republic
|
|-
| Win
| align=center|12–2–1
| Rokas Stambrauskas
| TKO (corner stoppage)
| GCF Challenge: Back in the Fight 4
| 
| align=center|1
| align=center|5:00
| Příbram, Czech Republic
| 
|-
| Draw
| align=center|
| Mikhail Mokhnatkin
| Draw (majority)
| Fight Nights: Battle of Moscow 18
| 
| align=center|3
| align=center|5:00
| Moscow, Russia
|
|-
| Win
| align=center|11–2
| Darko Stošić
| TKO (punches)
| GCF Challenge: Cage Fight 5
| 
| align=center|1
| align=center|1:09
| Brno, Czech Republic
| 
|-
| Win
| align=center|10–2
| Tomáš Penz
| TKO (flying knee and punches)
| GCF 28: Cage Fight 4
| 
| align=center|1
| align=center|0:41
| Brno, Czech Republic
| 
|-
| Win
| align=center| 9–2
| Viktor Bogutzki
| Submission (rear-naked choke)
| GCF 27: Road to the Cage
| 
| align=center| 1
| align=center| 2:17
| Prague, Czech Republic
|
|-
| Win
| align=center| 8–2
| Martin Šolc
| KO (flying knee)
| GCF 26: Fight Night
| 
| align=center| 3
| align=center| 4:00
| Prague, Czech Republic
| 
|-
| Win
| align=center| 7–2
| Oliver Dohring
| TKO (punches)
| Rock the Cage 4
| 
| align=center| 1
| align=center| N/A
| Greifswald, Germany
|
|-
| Loss
| align=center| 6–2
| Abdul-Kerim Edilov
| Submission (rear-naked choke)
| Fight Nights: Battle of Moscow 12
| 
| align=center| 1
| align=center| 1:56
| Moscow, Russia
|
|-
| Win
| align=center| 6–1
| Radovan Estocin
| KO (flying knee and punches)
| GCF 23: MMA Cage Fight 2
| 
| align=center| 1
| align=center| 0:26
| Brno, Czech Republic
|
|-
| Win
| align=center| 5–1
| Josef Žák
| TKO (punches)
| GCF 19: Back in the Fight 2
| 
| align=center| 1
| align=center| N/A
| Příbram, Czech Republic
|
|-
| Loss
| align=center| 4–1
| Bojan Veličković
| TKO (punches)
| SFC 1: Balkan Fighter Night
| 
| align=center| 1
| align=center| N/A
| Belgrade, Serbia
|
|-
| Win
| align=center| 4–0
| Strahinja Denić
| Submission (triangle choke)
| Ring Fight Brno
| 
| align=center| 1
| align=center| 2:10
| Brno, Czech Republic
|
|-
| Win
| align=center| 3–0
| Martin Vaniš
| TKO (punches)
| GCF 17: Big Cage Ostrava 2
| 
| align=center| 1
| align=center| 2:48
| Ostrava, Czech Republic
| 
|-
| Win
| align=center| 2–0
| Vladimír Eis
| KO (knee)
| GCF 15: Justfight Challenger
| 
| align=center| 1
| align=center| 1:02
| Karlovy Vary, Czech Republic
|
|-
| Win
| align=center| 1–0
| Stanislav Futera
| KO (punch)
| GCF 10: Battle in the Cage
| 
| align=center| 1
| align=center| 0:53
| Mladá Boleslav, Czech Republic
| 
|-

See also
List of current UFC fighters
List of male mixed martial artists

Filmography

Television

Web

References

External links

1992 births
Living people
Sportspeople from Brno
Czech male kickboxers
Light heavyweight kickboxers
Czech male mixed martial artists
Czech Muay Thai practitioners
Light heavyweight mixed martial artists
Mixed martial artists utilizing Muay Thai
Ultimate Fighting Championship male fighters